Fayetteville is a city and the county seat of Lincoln County, Tennessee, United States. The population was 6,994 at the 2000 census, and 6,827 at the 2010 census. A census estimate from 2018 showed 7,017.

History
Fayetteville is the largest city in Lincoln County. The city was established in 1809 by an Act of the Tennessee General Assembly. The act became effective on January 1, 1810.

The lands that include Lincoln County and Fayetteville were originally part of Cherokee and Chickasaw land.  They were ceded to the United States in 1806.

The city was named for Fayetteville, North Carolina, where some of its earliest residents had lived before moving to Tennessee. The earlier town was named for Gilbert du Motier, Marquis de Lafayette, a French general who fought for the United States during the American Revolution. Lincoln County was named for Major General Benjamin Lincoln, second in command of the U.S. Army at the end of the Revolutionary War.

The earliest white settler was Ezekiel Norris, who gave the one hundred acres upon which the city was built. In addition to Ezekiel Norris, other founding fathers of Fayetteville include: Alexander and Andrew Greer, William Edmonson, and Matthew Buchanan.

In 1995, the International Gospel Hour radio broadcast, founded in Texarkana, Texas, by the clergyman V. E. Howard was transferred to the West Fayetteville Church of Christ in Fayetteville under the minister Winford Claiborne.

1952 Tornado
On February 29, 1952, the town was hit by a catastrophic and violent F4 tornado that damaged or obliterated numerous homes, businesses, trees, power lines, vehicles, and other buildings. Two people were killed and 150 others were injured.

Geography

Climate
The climate of Fayetteville is characterized by relatively warm temperatures and heavy rainfall throughout the year.  The Köppen Climate Classification subtype for this climate is "Cfa" (Humid Subtropical Climate). Fayetteville's Trewartha climate classification is also subtropical (Cf).

Demographics

2020 census

As of the 2020 United States census, there were 7,068 people, 3,092 households, and 1,548 families residing in the city.

2000 census
As of the census of 2000, there were 6,994 people, 3,054 households, and 1,804 families residing in the city. The population density was 952.2 people per square mile (367.9/km2). There were 3,370 housing units at an average density of 458.8 per square mile (177.3/km2). The racial makeup of the city was 71.39% White, 26.22% African American, 0.30% Native American, 0.30% Asian, 0.09% Pacific Islander, 0.27% from other races, and 1.43% from two or more races. Hispanic or Latino of any race were 0.81% of the population.

There were 3,054 households, out of which 24.5% had children under the age of 18 living with them, 38.0% were married couples living together, 18.0% had a female householder with no husband present, and 40.9% were non-families. 37.8% of all households were made up of individuals, and 20.5% had someone living alone who was 65 years of age or older. The average household size was 2.14 and the average family size was 2.81.

In the city, the population was spread out, with 21.2% under the age of 18, 8.1% from 18 to 24, 22.9% from 25 to 44, 22.1% from 45 to 64, and 25.7% who were 65 years of age or older. The median age was 43 years. For every 100 females, there were 76.3 males. For every 100 females age 18 and over, there were 70.8 males.

The median income for a household in the city was $23,830, and the median income for a family was $32,477. Males had a median income of $26,957 versus $22,382 for females. The per capita income for the city was $18,391. About 15.1% of families and 20.8% of the population were below the poverty line, including 27.8% of those under age 18 and 20.6% of those age 65 or over.

Landmarks

Old Stone Bridge
One of the most famous landmarks of Fayetteville is the remains of the Stone Bridge, commonly known by the locals of Fayetteville as the “Old Stone Bridge”. It was in 1860 that John Markum and Patrick Flannery, the architects and contractors, began the building of the bridge.  Consisting of six arches, the bridge was completed in January 1862 with a final cost of $40,000.  In 1863, during the Civil War, the bridge was ordered burned by General William T. Sherman, but this order was disobeyed because the river was easily forded at the bridge's base. The bridge stood until 1969, when it collapsed due to flooding.

Lincoln County Courthouse
The first courthouse for Lincoln County, which was made of logs, was completed in 1815. It was used as local headquarters by Union troops during the Civil War. The building was replaced by an Italianate structure in 1874.  This second courthouse was demolished and replaced by the current Colonial Revival-style building in 1970.

Camp Blount Monument
The Camp Blount marker, erected in 1998, stands along Huntsville Highway (US-431) near the WalMart shopping center.  The camp was located along the Elk River and was a meeting point for the Tennessee soldiers who were serving under General Andrew Jackson in the Creek War of 1813–1814. Camp Blount also was a meeting point for soldiers during the Seminole Wars in 1818 and 1836, and for both Confederate and Federal troops during the Civil War.

Attractions

Lincoln County Fair
The Lincoln County Fair grounds are located in Fayetteville Tennessee. The Lincoln County Fair Association was issued its charter in 1906 and is a nonprofit organization with all profits going back into maintaining the fair grounds. In 1980, the fair became a district fair, serving five counties and paying over $10,000 in agriculture premiums.

As far back as 1889, there are records for the harness racing that takes place still today at the fairgrounds. The racetrack was made of red clay until 1978 when it was converted to an all weather track by grading it and covering it in limestone dust. Other elements of the fair include a demolition derby, rides, food vendors, a cattle showing, pageants, art competition, and concerts.

Economy 
Bavarian-based Grammer AG operates a site in Fayetteville. It manufactures components for the automotive industry.

Notable people

John Neely Bryan, founder of the city of Dallas, Texas
Jim Bob Cooter, NFL offensive coordinator
Rick Dempsey, former Major League Baseball player
Bob Higgins, former Major League Baseball player
Kelly Holcomb, former NFL quarterback
Frank Kelso, U.S. Navy admiral
Ira L. Kimes, brigadier general and Marine aviator
Anthony Shelton, former NFL and CFL player
Hatton W. Sumners, former congressman
Ed Townsend, singer-songwriter, co-wrote "Let's Get It On" with Marvin Gaye
Eddie Blake, former NFL and CFL player

References

External links

 Official website 
 City charter

Cities in Tennessee
Cities in Lincoln County, Tennessee
County seats in Tennessee
1809 establishments in Tennessee